Anticlinura is a genus of minute sea snails, marine gastropod mollusks or micromollusks in the family Mangeliidae.

Species
Species within the genus Anticlinura include:
 Anticlinura atlantica Garcia, 2005
 Anticlinura biconica (Schepman, 1913)
 Anticlinura monochorda (Dall, 1908)
 Anticlinura movilla (Dall, 1908)
 Anticlinura peruviana (Dall, 1908)
 Anticlinura serilla (Dall, 1908)

References

 Anticlinura Thiele 1934.Handbuch der systematischen Weichtierkunde, 2(3): 1002
  Bouchet, P.; Kantor, Y. I.; Sysoev, A.; Puillandre, N. (2011). A new operational classification of the Conoidea. Journal of Molluscan Studies. 77, 273-308

External links
 W.H. Dall (1908) Reports on the Mollusca and Brachiopoda, Bulletin of the Museum of Comparative Zoology at Harvard College. vol. 43
  Tucker, J.K. 2004 Catalog of recent and fossil turrids (Mollusca: Gastropoda). Zootaxa 682:1-1295.

 
Gastropod genera